Nehrəxəlil (also, Nehrakhalil) is a village and municipality in the Agdash District of Azerbaijan. It has a population of 1,262.

Notable natives 

 Fariz Safarov — Hero of the Soviet Union.

References 

Populated places in Agdash District